Arthur Campbell Ainger  (4 July 1841, Greenwich, Kent – 26 October 1919, Eton, now in Berkshire) was an assistant master at Eton College from 1864 to 1901. and wrote the text of more than ten Christian hymns, most notably God Is Working His Purpose Out (1894).

Ainger, whose father was Rev. Thomas Ainger, was educated at Eton College, and in 1860 matriculated at Trinity College, Cambridge; there he became a Scholar in 1863 and graduated B.A. (16th in Classics Tripos) in 1864 and M.A. in 1867.  At Trinity College he gave two Clark Lectures: Chaucer (1900) and Shakespeare as a humorist (1901). He was appointed a Member of the Royal Victorian Order (MVO) in 1908.

Ainger also wrote several books.

Selected publications
with H. G. Wintle: 
 (See Fives.)

with H. G. Wintle:

References

External links

1841 births
1919 deaths
People educated at Eton College
Teachers at Eton College
Alumni of Trinity College, Cambridge
Members of the Royal Victorian Order
English hymnwriters